The Jerusalem Cross or Jerusalem Memorial Cross (Jerusalem-Erinnerungskreuz) was a decoration of Prussia established 31 October 1898.  The cross was awarded to those who traveled with Emperor Wilhelm II on his 1898 visit to Palestine and attended the inauguration of the Lutheran Church of the Redeemer, Jerusalem.

Insignia
The Jerusalem Cross is made in the shape of the Jerusalem cross. The cross consists of a large cross portent with four plain crosslets between the arms. The crosses are red enameled with silver-gilt borders. In the center of the cross is a round gold colored medallion.

The obverse side, the medallion depicts the Imperial Crown of the Prussian German Emperor surmounting the letters IR (Imperator Rex) over the royal cypher of a stylized W II.  The reverse of the medallion bears the date 31 October 1898.  This date is depicted using a large Roman numeral X in the center for October, and a small Roman numeral XXXI at the top.  To the left is MDCCC and to the right side IIC for the year 1898.

See also
 Jerusalem Pilgrim's Cross

References

Orders, decorations, and medals of Prussia
1898 establishments in Germany
Awards established in 1898